Vera Yevgenyevna Dushevina (born 6 October 1986) is a Russian former professional tennis player.

She won one singles title and two doubles titles on the WTA Tour. As a junior, she won the Wimbledon Championships, beating Maria Sharapova in the final, while she reached the final of the French Open losing to Anna-Lena Grönefeld.

Personal life
Dushevina was born in Moscow. Beside tennis, Vera also played football and basketball.

Tennis career

Early years
She played her first main-draw match at the 2002 Warsaw Open by qualifying, but lost to Virginia Ruano Pascual 1–6, 6–7. Her first WTA Tour match she won at the 2003 Miami Open. After qualifying, she defeated Patricia Wartusch 6–0, 6–3 but lost to fourth seed Justine Henin 3–6, 2–6 in the second round. She then won her first professional title at the ITF event in Innsbruck, Austria coming through the qualifying draw and defeating Melinda Czink in the final. In her next tournament, she reached her first WTA Tour semifinals at the Nordic Light Open, defeating her first top-50 player, then-world No. 35 Denisa Chládková, 6–2, 6–3 but losing to Jelena Kostanić in the semifinals. She then played her first Grand Slam main-draw match after qualifying but she lost to Ashley Harkleroad in the first round, in straight sets. At the Kremlin Cup, she upset then-world No. 28, Lisa Raymond, 6–2, 7–6, but lost to seventh seed Vera Zvonareva, 2–6, 1–6.

2005–2009
Dushevina began her 2005 campaign by losing in the first round at the Canberra Women's Classic to Anna-Lena Grönefeld. At the Australian Open, she reached the fourth round of a Grand Slam tournament for the first time, before losing to fifth seed Svetlana Kuznetsova. Along the way, she realized her first top-20 victory over then-world No. 11 Vera Zvonareva, 6–3, 6–3 in the second round. She qualified for the Open Gaz de France and Dubai Championships but fell to Dinara Safina 2–6, 4–6 in the second round and to Nathalie Dechy, 7–6, 4–6, 6–7 in the first round, respectively. She then lost four straight matches in the second round of the Miami Open and the first rounds of Amelia Island, Warsaw and Berlin. However, she bounced back by reaching the quarterfinals of the Internationaux de Strasbourg losing to eventual champion Anabel Medina Garrigues in three sets. At the French Open, she lost to 21st seed Mary Pierce.
Dushevina reached her first WTA Tour singles final at the Eastbourne International as a qualifier where she finished runner-up to former world No. 1, Kim Clijsters. In the said tournament, she realized her first top-5 victory over then-world No. 3, Amélie Mauresmo, 6–4, 6–4 in the second round. However, she fell in the first round of Wimbledon to Ana Ivanovic, in straight sets. She then bounced back to reach the semifinals of the Nordic Light Open, losing to Katarina Srebotnik in two. She reached the second round of the Connecticut Open losing to Elena Dementieva. Dushevina then suffered back-to-back to losses to Shahar Pe'er at the second round of the US Open and first round of the China Open. At the quarterfinals of the Korea Open, she fell to top seed Jelena Janković, followed by a first-round loss at the Kremlin Cup to Elena Likhovtseva in three sets, respectively. She then avenged her loss to Janković at the Generali Ladies Linz, defeating her 7–6, 3–6, 6–0 in the first round, but fell to Sybille Bammer in the next.

Dushevina had a poor 2006 season. She reached the second rounds of the Auckland Open and the International Women's Hardcourts losing to top-ten players Nadia Petrova and Justine Henin, respectively. She then fell in the first round of the Australian Open to Catalina Castaño in straight sets, and also fell in the second rounds of the WTA indoor event in Paris and the Dubai Tennis Championships to then-world No. 2, Amélie Mauresmo, and then-world No. 4, Maria Sharapova, respectively. She suffered a back-to-back first-round loss at the Qatar Open and Miami Open. Later, earned her best performance of the year by reaching the third round of the Amelia Island Championships, losing to Patty Schnyder 3–6, 5–7. At the Estoril Open, she was upset by Antonella Serra Zanetti 6–4, 6–4 in the first round. She then suffered four consecutive second-round exits at the German Open and French Open to then-world No. 1 Amélie Mauresmo, at the Italian Open to Patty Schnyder, and the Eastbourne International to Anna-Lena Grönefeld. She then fell five consecutive first-round main-draw matches, at Wimbledon, at the LA Championships, Rogers Cup, US Open, and the China Open. She reached the second rounds of the Korea Open and Japan Open, and then suffered back-to-back main-draw match to compatriot Vera Zvonareva at the Kremlin Cup and Hasselt Cup.

Two years later, she reached her second final at the Nordic Light Open, losing in straight sets to Agnieszka Radwańska. Dushevina reached the final of the Stockholm event again in 2007, losing to Caroline Wozniacki. Dushevina has won one doubles title, the Warsaw Open, playing with Tatiana Perebiynis in 2007. She was also a part of the winning Russian team in the 2005 Fed Cup, winning doubles ties in the quarterfinals and semifinals partnering Dinara Safina. Dushevina began writing a blog for Eurosport about her time on the tour in 2009.

In June 2009 at the Eastbourne International, she lost in 45 minutes to Canadian Aleksandra Wozniak in the quarterfinals, 1–6, 0–6, winning only 17 of the 69 points in the match, and losing every one of her service games..
Dushevina upset world No. 22, Alizé Cornet, in the first round of the Wimbledon Championships, but fell to Elena Vesnina in the second.
Dushevina won her first WTA career title at the İstanbul Cup, defeating Lucie Hradecká 6–0, 6–1 in the final.

2010–2011
Dushevina started 2010 by qualifying for the Sydney International where she reached the quarterfinals with wins over Casey Dellacqua and Elena Vesnina, but lost to then world No. 1, Serena Williams, in the quarterfinals. She then fell in the first round of the Australian Open to compatriot and fifth seed Elena Dementieva, 2–6, 1–6. At the Pattaya Open, she was upset in the second round by world No. 121, Ekaterina Bychkova, 6–4, 6–1. She then fell in the first rounds of the Dubai Tennis Championships and Miami Open and the second round of the Indian Wells Open.

She then reached the third round of the Charleston Open losing to eventual champion, Samantha Stosur, 1–6, 6–3, 1–6, but fell early in the Italian Open to Andrea Petkovic, 3–6, 0–6. In the second round of the Madrid Open, Dushevina lost the most competitive match of her career against world No. 1, Serena Williams. Williams finally won 6–7, 7–6, 7–6, after 3 hours and 26 minutes despite being 5–2 up in the final set. Dushevina had match point at 7–6, 6–5 but could not close out the match. She was also 4–0 up in the final set tie-break before losing. It was also Williams' longest match. She then fell in the first rounds of the French Open and Eastbourne International. At Wimbledon, she upset French Open champion Francesca Schiavone in the first round in three sets, but fell to eventual semifinalist Tsvetana Pironkova in the following round.

She reached the back-to-back quarterfinals in the Slovenia Open and İstanbul Cup losing to Anna Chakvetadze 6–2, 3–6, 5–7 and Jarmila Groth 5–7, 2–6, respectively. She then fell in the second round of the Cincinnati Open to Jelena Janković 4–6, 6–3, 1–6. She then fell in the qualifying rounds of Rogers Cup and Connecticut Open. In the US Open she fell in the first round to Alona Bondarenko. In the Korea Open, she upset former world No. 1, Ana Ivanovic, 2–6, 6–4, 6–2 but fell in the next round to Klára Zakopalová. She then reached the third round of the China Open as a qualifier losing to Francesca Schiavone. In her final tournament of the year, at the Kremlin Cup, she was able to reach her first semifinal since winning in the 2009 İstanbul Cup, after defeating three consecutive compatriots, Ekaterina Makarova, Elena Vesnina and Anna Chakvetadze, before falling to another, Maria Kirilenko, 1–6, 1–6.

Vera started 2011 by losing in the qualifying draw of the Sydney International. At the Australian Open, she was able to pick up her first win in six years by defeating Maria Elena Camerin 6–3, 3–6, 6–1 but fell to fifth seed Sam Stosur in the next round. She also fell in the first rounds of Paris and Dubai. At Doha, she qualified and defeated María José Martínez Sánchez before she lost to Daniela Hantuchová.

2017: Retirement
Dushevina announced her retirement from professional tennis on 15 August 2017 because of several injuries. She said she would like to concentrate on coaching.

Performance timelines

Only main-draw results in WTA Tour, Grand Slam tournaments, Fed Cup and Olympic Games are included in win–loss records.

Singles

Doubles

Significant finals

WTA Premier Mandatory & 5 finals

Doubles: 1 runner-up

WTA career finals

Singles: 4 (1 title, 3 runner-ups)

Doubles: 11 (2 titles, 9 runner-ups)

ITF finals

Singles: 1 title

Doubles: 6 (5 titles, 1 runner-up)

Junior Grand Slam tournament finals

Singles: 2 (1 title, 1 runner-up)

Record against other players

Top 10 wins

Notes

References

External links

 
 
 

1986 births
Living people
People from Khimki
Tennis players from Moscow
Russian female tennis players
Wimbledon junior champions
Grand Slam (tennis) champions in girls' singles